(−)-Aurantiamine is a blue fluorescence metabolite produced by the fungus Penicillium aurantiogriseum, the most common fungi found in cereals.   (−)-Aurantiamine  belongs to a class of naturally occurring 2,5-diketopiperazines featuring a dehydrohistidine residue that exhibit important biological activities, such as anti-cancer or neurotoxic effects.  It is the isopropyl analog of the microtubule binding agent (−)-phenylahistin but is 40 times less active than the latter on P388 cell proliferation. The total asymmetric synthesis of (−)-aurantiamine has been described.

References

Diketopiperazines
Aurantiamine
Imidazoles